Gadget Boy & Heather is an animated television series co-produced between DIC Productions, L.P., France Animation, and M6. The series originally debuted in September 1995 in first-run syndication in the United States on Bohbot Entertainment's Amazin' Adventures II block and in October 1995 on M6 in France on the channel's M6 Kid block. It is a prequel of the original Inspector Gadget series from 1983.

Plot
This series is about "Gadget Boy", a bionic kid-detective with a personality similar to that of Inspector Gadget. Just as clumsy as the original Inspector Gadget, Gadget Boy was usually bailed out of situations by the more practical Heather, though he was also helped greatly by his myriad high-tech gadgets and extendable arms and legs. Gadget Boy's bionic implants were installed by Switzerland-based inventor Myron Dabble (voiced by Maurice LaMarche) who has an unrequited crush on Heather. Gadget Boy and Heather receive their assignments from Italy-based Chief Stromboli (also voiced by LaMarche), who, much like Chief Quimby, is a frequent, long-suffering victim of Gadget Boy's bungling. Gadget Boy is assisted by the beautiful and resourceful agent Heather (voiced by Tara Strong), a very tall equivalent of sorts to Penny (the difference being that Heather is in her early 20s). He is also assisted by a robotic dog named G-9 (also LaMarche), who serves as the "Brain" of this series, which shows through his morphing capabilities to get the gang out of the stickiest situations.

The main villain of this series, instead of Dr. Claw, is the mask-wearing six-armed villainess Spydra (voiced by Louise Vallance) who is accompanied by Boris, a frequently abused, wisecracking, sarcastic vulture with a Russian accent, along with her henchmen Mulch and his twin brother Houmous, all played by Maurice LaMarche.

The main title theme song was written and performed by Mike Piccirillo. Musical underscore composers were Mike Piccirillo and Jean-Michel Guirao.

Cast

Heroes
 

Gadget Boy: voiced by Don Adams and later Maurice LaMarche in English, and Luq Hamet and later Élie Semoun in French, is a bionic police detective working for Interpol in New York City. He is equipped by his dog, G-9, and assisted by Heather. He was conceived as a bionic "child" with the personality of a "perfect adult detective" (although as with the aforementioned Inspector Gadget, he is anything but). Much like Inspector Gadget, Gadget Boy is equipped with gadgets in his body while he is clumsy as Gadget but will use the gadgets to get himself out of sticky situations. The bionic implants were installed by the inventor Myron Dabble. Agent Heather bails Gadget Boy out of danger, though he was also helped greatly by his myriad high-tech gadgets and extendable arms and legs. However, Gadget Boy is usually seen with Heather and G9, unlike Gadget, who in the original series, will usually inform Penny and Brain once he receives his assignment that the mission is too dangerous and that he will be going on the mission alone, and usually be convinced that a disguised Brain is a M.A.D. agent. Gadget Boy and G-9 appear to switch between being fully robotic to being half robotic in different episodes. In #10, "Gadget Boy and the Uncommon Cold", it is revealed that Gadget Boy is half robot and thus catches a cold while G-9 does not. However, in #20, "Boy Power of Babble", Gadget Boy is unaffected by the "babblizer ray" because he is half robot with a mechanical brain, whereas G-9 is completely robotic. Don Adams voices Gadget Boy, similar to being the original voice of Inspector Gadget. Gadget Boy commonly says "Sowsers! Bowsers!", similar to Inspector Gadget's catchphrase, "Wowsers!".

Agent Heather: voiced by Tara Strong in English and Catherine Privat in French, is an Interpol agent and the aide to Gadget Boy. Heather has a slim build with short auburn hair and blue eyes and wears a green jacket, white shirt, blue jeans, and dark teal ballet shoes. She is a more resourceful agent and is the equivalent of Penny from Inspector Gadget, except Heather is much taller than Penny and appears to be in her early 20s. Her name is Estelle in the French version and it is revealed in Gadget Boy and the Wee Folk that her Blood Line is Irish.

G-9: voiced by Maurice LaMarche, is Gadget Boy's robotic dog, similar to Brain from Inspector Gadget. He can morph into anything and assists Gadget Boy to get him and his gang out of the stickiest situations. Gadget Boy and G-9 appear to switch between being fully robotic to being half robotic in different episodes. Although G-9 is a robot dog, in #20, "Boy Power of Babble", G-9 is revealed to be half robot when he is affected by the "babblizer ray", enabling him the ability to speak in an old English, intelligent accent. Unlike Brain, G-9 is usually seen with Gadget Boy, and Gadget Boy does not mistake him for being an enemy agent, as opposed to when the original Inspector Gadget will usually, on the case, mistake Brain appearing incognito for being a M.A.D. agent.
Chief Drake Stromboli: voiced by LaMarche, is the chief of Interpol. He speaks in an Italian accent. Chief Stromboli has white hair and a white mustache and gives Gadget Boy and Heather their assignments. Like Chief Quimby from Inspector Gadget, Chief Stromboli is a frequent, long-suffering victim of Gadget Boy's bungling. Assignments are printed on a long sheet of paper, often coming out of his tie, compared to the self-destructing paper on which Inspector Gadget will receive his messages, and don't blow up in his face. 
Myron Dabble: voiced by LaMarche, is an inventor from Switzerland working for Interpol. He is the man who, like Professor von Slickstein, equipped Gadget Boy with his gadgets. Myron Dabble wears glasses and has an unrequited crush on Heather. In the season 2 episode "Back to the Vulture", it is revealed that he was really born in Cleveland and spoke in a Swiss accent because he moved to Switzerland in his youth.

Villains

Spydra: Spydra, voiced by Louise Vallance in English and Monique Thierry in French, is the main villain of the series. Spydra wears a pink mask and has six arms, speaks in a loud voice, and is almost the female version of Dr. Claw. Her primary goals are to bring down Gadget Boy and commit grand crimes of all kinds. Usually, Spydra is seen in her lair, much like Dr. Claw is seen at his computer terminal, either in his castle or on the M.A.D.mobile, but does not run a large scale criminal organization similar to M.A.D. Also, Spydra's whole body can be seen, unlike Dr. Claw in the original series, where only his arms are seen and he is hiding behind a chair, and Spydra can get out of her chair. Spydra is named for resembling a spider, sporting six arms and keeping her face hidden under a mask. She occasionally takes her mask off to use one of her main powers: the ability to petrify anyone who sees her real face. Of course, the unmasking is always done off-screen or is obscured. Her pet is a vulture named Boris, and she is usually abusive towards Boris, often using alliterations to insult Boris. Spydra's minions are the twin brothers Mulch and Hummus, the only recurring minions in the series, as opposed to the different recurring unnamed M.A.D. agents in Inspector Gadget (and sometimes a supervillain who will have a name and appear once, which is less apparent in the second season of the series). Her name is Arachna in the French version.

Boris: Boris, voiced by Maurice LaMarche, is Spydra's pet talking vulture. Boris is frequently abused by Spydra, and his wisecracking and sarcastic. He speaks in a Russian accent. Boris differs from M.A.D. Cat in that M.A.D. Cat is a foil to Dr. Claw, in which he will either be petted or pounded on, whereas Boris is only abused in many ways by Spydra, such as being insulted, thrown, or, in extreme cases, petrified by Spydra. He tends to remind Spydra he has a desk job and likes food.

Mulch and Hummus: Mulch and Hummus, both voiced by Maurice LaMarche, are twin brothers and Spydra's criminal henchmen. Spydra sends out Mulch and Hummus to do her dirty work. The design of Mulch and Hummus is somewhat like the recurring M.A.D. agents from the original Inspector Gadget series; however, Mulch and Hummus are the only henchmen to Spydra, as opposed to a large number of M.A.D. agents working for Dr. Claw. The running gag is she can't tell which is which (Boris says Hummus is the one with the big nose).

Gadget Boy's Adventures in History
The second season of the series was produced in 1997, and was titled Gadget Boy's Adventures in History. In this series, the young detective has to stop the evil Spydra across time and was made to fulfill E/I criteria. This version, like Inspector Gadget's Field Trip, an Inspector Gadget spin off, aired on The History Channel. The series was later repeated on Toon Disney like with Season 1, and also on This is for Kids on This TV until September 23, 2011. Gadget Boy's Adventures in History (along with Field Trip) would also mark the final time that Don Adams voiced the character in any form. The next time Inspector Gadget appeared would be in the 2002 series Gadget and the Gadgetinis where he was now voiced by Maurice LaMarche.

Series overview

Episode list

Home media
On May 28, 2003, Sterling Entertainment released a DVD/VHS titled "Gadget Boy Saves the World", containing four episodes (three on the VHS) of the series. The DVD was re-released by NCircle Entertainment in 2008 alongside another DVD titled "Along Came A Spydra", which also contained four episodes.

On February 21, 2012, Mill Creek Entertainment released Gadget Boy's Adventures in History- The Complete Series on DVD in Region 1 for the very first time. The 3-disc set featured all 26 episodes from the second season of the series and also contains bonus episodes from Johnny Test, The New Adventures of Nanoboy, World of Quest, Super Duper Sumos and The Wacky World of Tex Avery. Mill Creek also released a 10 episode best-of collection titled "Stopping Evil Across Time" on the same day, also containing a bonus episode of Johnny Test.

Airing
The first season originally aired on First-run Syndication through Bohbot Entertainment's Amazin' Adventures II block, while Adventures in History and reruns of Season 1 aired on The History Channel until 2000.

In the United States, reruns were shown on Toon Disney, between 1998 and 2001. From 2010-September 2011, the series reaired on This TV on their Cookie Jar Toons block. 

In the United Kingdom, the series aired on BBC One and BBC Two on the CBBC block from 1997 to 2001, after which from 2002-2012 (approx) it ran during the early hours of the morning on Cartoon Network and Boomerang.

From 1998 to 2000, the series was broadcast in Canada on Family Channel.

See also
 DIC Entertainment
 Inspector Gadget
 Inspector Gadget's Field Trip
 Gadget & the Gadgetinis

References

External links
DHX Media's Gadget Boy Official Site
Gadget Boy and Heather on the Internet Movie Database
Gadget Boy's Adventures in History on the Internet Movie Database
Gadget Boy & Heather on TV.com

1990s American animated television series
1990s French animated television series
1995 American television series debuts
1998 American television series endings
1995 French television series debuts
1998 French television series endings
American children's animated action television series
American children's animated adventure television series
American children's animated comic science fiction television series
Animated television series about children
English-language television shows
French children's animated action television series
French children's animated adventure television series
French children's animated comic science fiction television series
French-language television shows
Inspector Gadget
First-run syndicated television programs in the United States
BBC children's television shows
American time travel television series
Television series by DIC Entertainment
Cyborgs in television
Child versions of cartoon characters
1990s American time travel television series